Robinson County is one of the 141 Cadastral divisions of New South Wales. It is centred on Cobar.

Robinson County was named in honour of Sir Hercules George Robert Robinson, First Baron Rosmead (1824-1897).

Parishes within this county
A full list of parishes found within this county; their current LGA and mapping coordinates to the approximate centre of each location is as follows:

References

Counties of New South Wales